is a 1960 Japanese horror film directed and co-written by Yoshihiro Ishikawa, in his directorial debut. Produced by Shintoho, it belongs to the subgenre of "ghost cat" films (kaibyō eiga or bake neko mono), featuring a cat-like supernatural entity.

Cast
 Shōzaburō Date
 Noriko Kitazawa
 Yōichi Numata
 Namiji Matsuura

References

External links
 

Japanese horror films
1960 films
1960 horror films
Films set in Japan
1960s Japanese films